is a platform video game series developed by Sega, and starring the titular Alex Kidd.

Games 

The franchise includes seven titles.

 Alex Kidd in Miracle World - 1986, Master System
 Alex Kidd: The Lost Stars - 1986, Arcade, 1988, Master System
 Alex Kidd BMX Trial - 1987, Master System
 Alex Kidd: High-Tech World - 1987, Master System
 Alex Kidd in the Enchanted Castle - 1989, Sega Genesis
 Alex Kidd in Shinobi World - 1990, Master System
 Alex Kidd in Miracle World DX - 2021, PC, Nintendo Switch, PlayStation 4, PlayStation 5, Xbox One, Xbox Series X/S

Overview 
The first game in the series, Alex Kidd in Miracle World, was released in 1986 and built into later versions of the Master System and the Master System II model, replacing the Snail Maze/Safari Hunt/Hang-On games of the first model. This integrated SMSII version reversed the attack and jump buttons from the earlier cartridge version to conform to that of other popular action games of the day. A notable visual difference is in the original cartridge version, Alex is shown eating Japanese onigiri, but in the SMSII integrated version, it has been changed to a hamburger to appeal to Western players.

Most games in the Alex Kidd series differ dramatically from one another, the sole exception being Miracle World and its direct sequel, Alex Kidd in the Enchanted Castle. While most games in the series were still platform-based, the only elements that tied the series together was the name and the title character. One game in the series, Alex Kidd: High-Tech World, was not an Alex Kidd game in Japan and was based instead on a 1980s Japanese animated series airing at the time, Anmitsu Hime.

After the release of Alex Kidd in Shinobi World in 1990, Sega decided to shift focus towards Sonic the Hedgehog.

In 2020, Sega confirmed that they would be publishing a remake of Alex Kidd in Miracle World developed by Merge Games and Jankenteam. This ended up being Alex Kidd in Miracle World DX, released on June 22nd, 2021.

Legacy 
Alex Kidd titles have been re-released as part of various Sega video game compilations, including Sonic's Ultimate Genesis Collection and Sega Vintage Collection.

Notes

References

External links 

 
 

 
Video game franchises introduced in 1986
Sega Games franchises